Jorge van Balen (born 23 April 1954) is a Venezuelan former swimmer. He competed in the men's 100 metre freestyle at the 1972 Summer Olympics.

References

1954 births
Living people
Venezuelan male swimmers
Olympic swimmers of Venezuela
Swimmers at the 1972 Summer Olympics
Place of birth missing (living people)
20th-century Venezuelan people